Tacheng Airport  is an airport serving Tacheng, a city in Xinjiang Uyghur Autonomous Region, China.

Facilities
It has one runway designated 12/30 which measures

Airlines and destinations

See also
 List of airports in China

References

External links
 
 

Airports in Xinjiang
Tacheng Prefecture
Airports established in 1994